Torre del Pozzo is a small coastal village in Sardinia within the municipal territory of Cuglieri. It includes the 7 km long Arenas beach and is flanked by a large marine pine forest.  
The tower on the headland once served as a watch tower to safe-guard the island from invaders from the sea. There is also a  natural vertical tunnel not far from the tower, eroded through the limestone and sandstone by the sea.  It gushes sea water when the Mistral blows from the north-west.

Municipalities of the Province of Oristano